David Philp (born: 23 May 1971) is a sailor from Fiji. who represented his country at the 1992 Summer Olympics in Barcelona, Spain as crew member in the Soling. With helmsman Colin Philp, Sr. and fellow crew member Colin Dunlop they took the 23rd place.

References

Living people
1971 births
Sailors at the 1992 Summer Olympics – Soling
Olympic sailors of Fiji
Fijian male sailors (sport)